Hopea dasyrrhachia is a species of plant in the family Dipterocarpaceae. It is found in Brunei, Indonesia, and Malaysia.

References

dasyrrhachia
Endangered plants
Taxonomy articles created by Polbot
Taxobox binomials not recognized by IUCN